Urdiales de Colinas is a deserted locality and minor local entity located in the municipality of Igüeña, in León province, Castile and León, Spain. As of 2020, it has a population of 0.

References

Populated places in the Province of León